Abida Parveen (born 1954) is a Pakistani singer who excels in Sufi music, folk singing and ghazal. 

Starting her journey from Radio Pakistan in 1973, she today is a towering figure in the world of Sufi music. Parveen has launched more than 100 albums. She performs worldwide and prefers spreading the Sufi word by her vocals abroad. 

Arguably, Raqs-e-Bismil (2001) is Parveen's most popular album. Her songs are also used in other albums in which songs from different singers are being combined to produce one rarity. Her most recent album is Shah jo Risalo on which she recorded all of Shah Abdul Latif Bhittai's kalam in an 11 volume CD. She is best known for the songs "Yaar ko Hamne Jabaja Dekha", written by Shah Niyaz from the album Raqs-e-Bismil; "Tere Ishq Nachaya", written by Bulleh Shah from the album Tere Ishq Nachaya; and "Jab se tune Mujhe" written by Nasir Kazmi from the album Ghazal ka Safar.
"Tu Ne Diwana Banaya" written by Zaheen Shah Taji.

Discography
This list is not exhaustive.

References

Parveen, Abida